This is a list of Irish butterflies, past and present.
Details on specific species are relevant to the Irish populations and some details may not be consistent with the species in other parts of its range.

Family Hesperiidae (skippers)

Subfamily Hesperiinae (grass skippers)
Essex skipper - Thymelicus lineola  County Wexford only. Origin uncertain.
Small skipper - Thymelicus sylvestris  Confirmed in County Kildare in 2011 and 2012.

Subfamily Pyrginae (spread-winged skippers)
Dingy skipper – Erynnis tages  Mainly Midlands and West. The subspecies baynesi Huggins, 1956 is recorded from the Burren region of Co Clare and Galway. The populations elsewhere in Ireland are presumably the type subspecies.

Family Pieridae (whites)

Subfamily Dismorphiinae
Wood white – Leptidea sinapis  Confined to the Burren area of Co. Clare (here sympatric with Leptidea juvernica)
Cryptic wood white - Leptidea juvernica  stat. nov. All regions of Ireland. Not known in Britain.

Subfamily Coliadinae
Clouded yellow – Colias croceus  Migrant.
Brimstone – Gonepteryx rhamni  Burren and Midlands. The Irish subspecies is gravesi Huggins, 1956

Subfamily Pierinae
Large white – Pieris brassicae 
Small white – Pieris rapae 
Green-veined white – Pieris napi  The subspecies britannica (Muller & Kautz, 1939) is only found in Ireland. The British subspecies is sabellicae (Stephens, 1827)
Orange tip – Anthocharis cardamines  The Irish subspecies is hibernica (Williams, 1916)

Family Lycaenidae (gossamer-winged butterflies)

Subfamily Theclinae
Green hairstreak – Callophrys rubi  Scattered distribution.
Brown hairstreak – Thecla betulae  Restricted to Burren and surrounding region.
Purple hairstreak – Neozephyrus quercus  Restricted to a few woodland sites.

Subfamily Lycaeninae

Small copper – Lycaena phlaeas  The Irish subspecies is hibernica Goodson, 1948

Subfamily Polyommatinae
Small blue – Cupido minimus  Few regions. Restricted to coastal dunes, limestone grasslands and quarries.
Common blue – Polyommatus icarus  The Irish subspecies is  mariscolore (Kane, 1893)
Holly blue – Celastrina argiolus  More common in East and South.

Family Nymphalidae (brush-footed butterflies)

Subfamily Nymphalinae
Red admiral – Vanessa atalanta  resident reinforced by migrant populations.
Painted lady – Vanessa cardui  Migrant.
Peacock – Aglais io 
Small tortoiseshell – Aglais urticae 
Comma – Polygonia c-album  rare. Sightings on North and South-east coasts.

Subfamily Heliconiinae (longwings)
Pearl-bordered fritillary – Boloria euphrosyne  Only found in the Burren
Dark green fritillary – Speyeria aglaja  Coastal species also inland in the Burren and Wicklow
Silver-washed fritillary – Argynnis paphia  Scattered throughout Ireland, more common in southern regions.
Marsh fritillary – Euphydryas aurinia  infrasubspecies hibernica Birchall, 1873. Throughout Ireland but mainly Central and West Ireland.

Subfamily Satyrinae (browns)
Speckled wood – Pararge aegeria 
Wall – Lasiommata megera 
Grayling – Hipparchia semele  Coastal and limestone districts. The Irish subspecies are clarensis de Lattin, 1952 (County Clare) and hibernica Howarth, 1971
Gatekeeper – Pyronia tithonus  Restricted to South and South-East coasts.
Meadow brown – Maniola jurtina  The Irish subspecies is iernes Graves, 1930
Ringlet – Aphantopus hyperantus 
Small heath – Coenonympha pamphilus  Scattered throughout Ireland.Prefers drier grassland on well-drained soils.
Large heath – Coenonympha tullia  Restricted to a few bogs.

Vagrant, adventive, extinct and intercepts and exotic species

Extinct
Small mountain ringlet – Erebia epiphron  
Large copper - Lycaena dispar 
Vagrants

Pale clouded yellow – Colias hyale
Berger's clouded yellow – Colias alfacariensis
Short-tailed blue – Cupido argiades  (imported on fennel from Italy)
Geranium bronze – Cacyreus marshalli  (imported on geraniums)
Camberwell beauty – Nymphalis antiopa 
Map – Araschnia levana  (formerly introduced and bred)
Queen of Spain fritillary – Issoria lathonia 
Monarch – Danaus plexippus 
American painted lady – Vanessa virginiensis 
Swallowtail – Papilio machaon 

Exotics

See also
List of moths of Ireland

References 
Emmet, A.M., J. Heath et al. (Ed.), 1990. The Butterflies of Great Britain and Ireland. The Moths and Butterflies of Great Britain and Ireland Vol. 7 Part 1 (Hesperiidae to Nymphalidae). Harley Books, Colchester, UK. 370p.
K. G. M. Bond, R. Nash and J. P. O’Connor, An Annotated Checklist of the Irish Butterflies and Moths (Lepidoptera)The Irish Biogeographical Society in association with The National Museum of Ireland, Dublin, 2006, 177 pp 
Harding, J. & Jacob, M. 2013 Addition of Small Skipper butterfly (Thymelicus sylvestris) to the Irish List and notes on the Essex Skipper (Thymelicus lineola) (Lepidoptera: Hesperiidae). Irish Naturalists' Journal 32: 142-144
Mazel, R. 2001. Leptidea sinapis L., 1758 - L. reali Reissinger, 1989, le point de la situation (Lepidoptera: Pieridae, Dismorphiinae) Linneana Belgica 18: 199-202.
Nash,D., T. Boyd and D Hardiman. 2012. Ireland's Butterflies A Review. The Dublin Naturalists' Field Club, Dublin. 272 pp 
Wilson, C. J., Goodwin, J. & Bond, K. 2007.  New Irish record of the small skipper butterfly Thymelicus sylvestris (Poda) (Lepidoptera: Hesperiidae).  Irish Naturalists’ Journal 28(9): 385-386).Erroneous and later corrected by the authors. Refers to Essex Skipper Thymelicus lineola.

Footnotes

External links
Irish Butterflies
Butterflies and Moths of Northern Ireland
Butterfly Ireland
NHM Images of Ireland forms and subspecies on this site. Type Ireland into the search box.
Wexford Naturalists' Field Club  Essex Skipper
Regan, E.C., Nelson, B., Aldwell, B., Bertrand, C., Bond, K., Harding, J., Nash, D.,Nixon, D. and Wilson, C.J. Ireland Red List No. 4: Butterflies
Database of Irish Lepidoptera.1 Macrohabitats, microsites and traits of Noctuidae and butterflies
Ireland Red List No. 4: Butterflies

Ireland
Ireland, butterflies
Ireland, butterflies